Jesse Christopher Luken (born 1983) is an American actor, producer, and writer. He is known for playing Jimmy Tolan in the FX drama series Justified and Eric in the CW science fiction romance series Star-Crossed.

Career
Luken began his career in 2008 with the short film Starlet. He has also had guest appearances in television series such as Privileged, Three Rivers, Greek, and Law & Order: LA, as well as a recurring role in the comedy web series Spymates. In 2012, he got his break when he was cast in a recurring role in the Fox series Glee. Later that year, Luken was cast in the ABC drama Last Resort. His first major film role was in the award-winning film 42 portraying baseball player Eddie Stanky. He played a recurring character in Justified from Seasons 3–5.

Personal life
Luken is a General William J. Palmer High School graduate and played baseball and football with Carl Wiedemann in his younger days. He studied at Colorado State University.

Legal issues
On December 6, 2018, Luken was arrested and charged with DUI after a single-car crash in Glendale, California. He posted bail and was released the same day.

Filmography

References

External links
 
 

1983 births
21st-century American male actors
American male film actors
American male television actors
Colorado State University alumni
Living people
Male actors from Colorado Springs, Colorado